Chantal Han (born 26 July 1966) is a Dutch judoka. She competed in the women's middleweight event at the 1992 Summer Olympics.

References

External links
 

1966 births
Living people
Dutch female judoka
Olympic judoka of the Netherlands
Judoka at the 1992 Summer Olympics
Sportspeople from Amsterdam
20th-century Dutch women